Oded Balilty (Hebrew: עודד בלילטי, born March 30, 1979, Jerusalem) is an Israeli documentary photographer. He is an Associated Press (AP) photographer and won the Pulitzer Prize for Breaking News Photography in 2007.

Biography
Oded Balilty is a Pulitzer Prize-winning Israeli photographer. Born and raised in Jerusalem, he began his career as a photographer for the Israeli army magazine Bamahane. In 2002, at the height of the second Palestinian uprising, he joined The Associated Press. In 2007, he won the Pulitzer Prize for his photograph of a lone Jewish settler confronting Israeli security officers during the evacuation of a West Bank settlement outpost. He is the only Israeli photographer to ever receive the Pulitzer Prize. From 2007-2008, he was based in Beijing for AP. Balilty lives in Tel Aviv and photographs current events and documentary features for AP in Israel, the Palestinian Territories, and around the world.

Solo exhibitions
 2015 “Sabra Traces” Eretz Israel Museum" Tel Aviv
 2014 “In Observation” Projex Connect, San Francisco
 2013 “Restraint,” N&N Gallery, Tel Aviv, Israel
 2013 “Israel, Soviet Style,” Russian Photo Forum, Moscow, Russia
 2011 "Marginal Notes" N&N Amana Gallery, Tel Aviv
 2009 POV Photo festival in Tel Aviv
 2009 "Hide and Seek" at the Artist House in Jerusalem
 2008 "China", photo festival of Gijon, Spain
 2007 “Chernobyl Today”, Coalmine photo gallery, Zurich, Switzerland
 2007 Lucca Digital Photo Festival, Italy
 2007 Musée d'ethnographie de Neuchâtel, Switzerland
 2005 Coalmine photo gallery, Zurich, Switzerland
 2006 “Chernobyl Today”, festival du Scoop, Angers, France
 2000 "Reflected Reality" (with artist Anna Shapira), Z.O.A House, Tel-Aviv

Selected group exhibitions
 2014 “The Double Exposure Project” Shpilman Institute For Photography, Tel Aviv
 2012 International Photography Festival, Tel Aviv, Israel
 2011 Ashdod Museum – A road to nowhere
 2008 Yad Vashem Holocaust museum, Jerusalem, portraits of Holocaust survivors
 2005 joint exhibition of Israeli and Palestinian photographers, War photography museum, Dubrovnik, Croatia
 2004 "AP Jerusalem", VISA pour L'image Perpignan, France

Awards
 2014 National Headliner Award (1st place portrait category)
 2014 NPPA Awards (Honorable Mention portrait category)
 2014 Picture of the Year International (2nd place, Portrait series)
 2013 Atlanta Photojournalism Seminar (1st place portrait and 2nd place sport feature)
 2013 Overseas Press Club of America (Feature Photography)
 2012 China International Press Photo Contest (1st place in daily life category, 2nd place in daily life and sports feature categories)
 2012 Atlanta Photojournalism Seminar (1st place, pictorial category)2012 Picture of the Year International (1st place, portrait)
 2012 Henri Nannen Prize Nomination2009 PX3 (3rd place in photojournalism general news)
 2009 Pulitzer Prize finalist (with group of Associated Press photographers for photos of Sichuan earthquake)
 2009 Picture of the Year International (Award of Excellence for “Ping Pong Nation” and coverage of Sichuan earthquake)
 2009 PGB Award (1st place for coverage of Sichuan earthquake)
 2009 National Headliner Awards (Photography Portfolio)
 2009 NPPA Awards (Honorable Mention, Natural Disaster)
 2008 World Press Photo (3rd place, People in the News)
 2008 Picture of the Year International (3rd place, news picture story)
 2008 APME (for coverage of Sichuan earthquake)
 2008 UNICEF Photo of the Year (2nd place, coverage of Sichuan earthquake)
 2008 Atlanta Photojournalism Seminar (awards in five categories for China photography)
 2007 National Geographic All Roads Photography Program
 2007 Pulitzer Prize for Breaking News Photography
 2007 World Press Photo (1st place, People in the News)
 2007 Germany Lead Awards (1st place, Photography Category)
 2007 Picture of the Year International (1st place, Human Conflict)
 2007 International Headliner Award (1st place)
 2007 NPPA (1st and 2nd place)
 2007 National Headliner Award (1st prize for Magazines, News Services, Syndicates – Spot News Photography)
 2007 Sigma Delta Chi Award (Spot News Photography)
 2007 APME Award (with group of photographers, for coverage of 2006 Israel-Lebanon War)
 2006 UNICEF Photo of the Year (Honorable Mention, Single Picture)
 2006 Atlanta Photojournalism Seminar (1st place, Best in Show)
 2006 Atlanta Photojournalism Seminar (1st place, Spot News)
 2006 Editor and Publisher Award (1st place for Multiple Images Photo Essay, Honorable Mention for Single Picture)
 2004 Editor and Publisher Award (1st place for multiple images/photo essays)
 2003 APME News Photography Award (with AP photographers, for coverage of violence in the Middle East)

References

External links
Oded Balilty's website
"TIME" article about Balilty's "Jewish wedding" series 
"The New York Times" article about Balilty's "Jewish wedding" series 
Pulitzer Prize for Balilty
Jerusalem Artists' House website on Balilty 2009 "Hide & Seek" exhibition
Balilty exhibition "Marginal Note"

Israeli journalists
Israeli photographers
Israeli Jews
Israeli photojournalists
Associated Press photographers
Pulitzer Prize for Photography winners
Living people
Documentary photographers
People from Jerusalem
1979 births